Alice Itterbeek (1902 - 1990) was a Belgian World War II resistance fighter. She was awarded the King's Medal for Courage in the Cause of Freedom.

Life 
Alice Rels was born in Saint-Josse-ten-Noode in 1902. She married Félicien Itterbeek in 1926, and they moved to Woluwe-Saint-Lambert. They had a son, Raymond, and a daughter, Eliane.

During the Second World War, Alice Itterbeek joined the Comet Line organization. It aided many Allied pilots and allowed them to return to England or free territory. She was arrested in May 1944, and was sentenced to five years of hard labour and deported to Ravensbrück concentration camp. With the approach of the Soviet troops, she was transferred to the Oranienburg concentration camp, then forced to participate in a death march that lasted 15 days, for more than 600 kilometers, until the Soviet troops liberated her and her fellow inmates.

Her husband and son were arrested at the same time, and also deported and sentenced to death. However, the sentence was not be carried out. Their daughter Eliane was hidden by friends of the YMCA (Young Men's Christian Association). The Itterbeek family reunited in May 1945.

Alice Itterbeek died in 1990. She is buried in Woluwe-Saint-Lambert Cemetery.

Legacy 
A park was dedicated to her, in Woluwe-Saint-Lambert, Belgium. Her son, Raymond, was commemorated as Righteous among the Nations.

References 

1902 births
1990 deaths
Belgian resistance members
People from Saint-Josse-ten-Noode
Ravensbrück concentration camp survivors